The Gromov Flight Research Institute or GFRI for short is an important Russian State Research Centre which operates an aircraft test base located in Zhukovsky, 40 km south-east of Moscow. The airfield is also known as Ramenskoye air base.
 
The airfield was used as the backup landing site for the Shuttle Buran test program and also as a test base for a Buran's aerodynamic prototype BTS-002.

GFRI periodically hosts the MAKS International Air Show (Aviasalon).

At present, GFRI also hosts Zhukovsky International Airport.

History

Foundation 
The Flight Research Institute was founded on March 8, 1941, in accordance with the decree of Sovnarkom and the Central Committee of the Communist Party of the Soviet Union. Mikhail Gromov, a test pilot, Hero of the Soviet Union, became its first chief. From the very beginning the institute participated in development and testing of aircraft and airborne systems, conducted flight research in order to pave the way to further scientific activities.

The first years of the institute's existence fell on the war times. During the war experts of the institute kept developing recommendations to eliminate defects in flight qualities and war-fighting capabilities of the aircraft, flight testing of the aircraft prototypes, studied the foreign aircraft and equipment, both purchased and taken as trophies.

Cold War 
Zhukovsky airfield was the Soviet Union's equivalent to the US Edwards AFB and as such many types of aircraft underwent evaluation.

Here some western aircraft were tested or analyzed:
 Wrecks from F-111s shot down over North Vietnam were sent to Zhukovskiy to be analyzed.
 Pieces of US planes shot down in North Vietnam and their captured electronic countermeasures equipment were taken for evaluation (F-111, A-6, A-7, B-52, F-4, F105, etc.).
 Captured VNAF helicopters are believed to have been tested (UH-1H, CH-47).

Perestroika times 

In 2001 GFRI had a staff of about 5000 then headed by Vyacheslav M. Bakaev. Number of research flying test-beds was about 70 complemented with 20 multipurpose test stands and simulators. The institute also supported Fedotov Test Pilot School. Newly built by AMST of Austria centrifuge then was one of the advanced in the world having a gondola with a 3D visual projection system and formed the core of GFRI's aerospace medical research complex. As said Vilgelm I. Vid (GFRI deputy chief for civil aviation) the institute pioneered a civil aircraft upset recovery system to decrease a number of CFIT accidents originated in aeroplane upsets. However, Bakaev said GFRI was passing through economic difficulties as most Russian aeronautical facilities. The institute was downsized by about 30% since 1996, and most of the test aircraft were underutilized.

Due to financial problems in the 1990s (known as perestroika times), tourist fighter flights in former secret jets became available, mainly for wealthy western tourists. The security check was comparable to the Russian visa. On offer for flights was the Aero L-39 Albatros jet trainer, the Soviet-built Mikoyan-Gurevich MiG-21, Mikoyan-Gurevich MiG-23, MiG-25 for stratosphere "Edge of Space" flights, the MiG-29 Fulcrum and even the Sukhoi Su-27 Flanker. From June 2006, such a flights was stopped. 

The airline was established by the institute in 1995 as a wholly owned commercial subsidiary and named Gromov Air (later Moskovia Airlines).

Current research and development activities 
 Aerospace flight research and testing in low and high speed aerodynamics, flight dynamics, propulsion and avionics technologies (GLL-8 (Gll-VK) Igla).
 Testing and certification services for prototype aircraft and on-board equipment.
 Research in aircraft flight safety, reliability, maintainability and other operating capabilities.
 Fedotov Test Pilot School for training test pilots, navigators, and on-board test engineers.
 Development, production and operation of a variety of flying testbeds including those based on the Tu-154, Su-30, Il-76, Il-103 aeroplanes, Mi-8 helicopters, etc.
 Development and production of flight testing instrumentation (low and high frequency data collection solid state storage systems, vibration parameters measuring devices, instant temperature sensors, miniaturized flat piezoresistance beat and pressure distribution sensors, hot-wire airflow velocity vector transducers and aerodynamic friction stress measurement products, etc.).

Testbed aeroplanes

Notable employees

Heads of the institute 
 Mikhail Gromov (March – August 1941)
  (1941–1942 and 1943–1947)
 Vasily Molokov (1942–1943)
  (1947–1951)
 Alexandr Kobzarev (1951–1954)
  (1954–1966)
  (1966–1981)
 Arseny Mironov (1981–1985)
  (1985–1995)
 Felix Zolotariev (1995–1998)
 Viacheslav Bakaev (1998–2004)
 Yury Klishin (2005–2006)
 Vadim Shalygin (2006–2007)
 Evgeny Gorbunov (2007–2009)
 Pavel Vlasov (2010–2017)
  (since 2017)

Scientists, test pilots, navigators, and engineers 
 Sergei Anokhin
 Yuri Garnaev
 Anatoly Kvochur
 Viktor Korostiev
Anatoly Levchenko
 Leonid Lobas
 Guy Severin
 Rimantas Stankevičius
 Amet-khan Sultan
 Ural Sultanov
 Max Taitz
 Igor Volk

See also 
 Armstrong Flight Research Center – the USA counterpart of the Gromov Flight Research Institute
 List of aerospace flight test centres

References

External links 
 
 
 GFRI airfield at Google Maps
 Historical video to celebrate 80 years of Gromov Flight Research Institute (in Russian)

Airports in Moscow Oblast
Airports built in the Soviet Union
United Aircraft Corporation
Companies based in Moscow Oblast
Buran program
Research institutes in Russia
Research institutes in the Soviet Union
Aviation in the Soviet Union
Aerospace research institutes
Aviation research institutes
Aerospace engineering organizations
Golden Idea national award winners